The Pegasus Quik is a British-designed ultralight trike, originally designed and produced by Pegasus Aviation, later by P&M Aviation, both of the United Kingdom. The design is now owned by  Albatross Flying Systems of Bangalore, India. The aircraft is supplied as a kit for amateur construction.

Design and development
The Quik's design goal was to produce a faster trike and to this end a smaller wing in both span and area than normal is employed. The smaller wing also gives improved turbulence resistance, but at the cost of a higher stall speed.

The Quik features a cable-braced or strut-braced hang glider-style high-wing, weight-shift controls, a two-seats-in-tandem open cockpit, tricycle landing gear and a single engine in pusher configuration.

The aircraft is made from bolted-together aluminium tubing, with its double-surface wing covered in Dacron sailcloth. On the initial model its  span wing is supported by a single tube-type kingpost and uses an "A" frame control bar. Later versions use a strut-braced "topless" style wing.

Variants

Quik 912S Executive
Quik
QuikR
2012 production version, designed to be even faster with a  span, strut-braced "topless" wing of  wing area.

Specifications (Quik 912S Executive)

References

External links

Pegasus Quik
2000s British ultralight aircraft
Homebuilt aircraft
Single-engined pusher aircraft
Ultralight trikes